Henriette van den Boorn-Coclet (15 January 18666 March 1945) was a Belgian composer. She was born in Liege, Belgium and studied at the Liège Conservatory with Jean-Théodore Radoux and Sylvain Dupuis, where she received a first prize in solfège (1887) harmony (1882) and fugue (1884). She also won a silver medal for chamber music (piano and strings) in 1886. After completing her education, she took a position teaching harmony at the Conservatory (1892–1931). She won the Prix de Rome in 1895. She died in Liege.

Her compositions make use of a late 19th-century neo-romantic style.

Works
Boorn-Coclet composed for orchestra, chamber ensemble, songs and piano. Selected works include:
Sonata for violin, 1907
Symphonie in F, 1904
 Callirhoe, 1895
 Mélodies
 Chöre
 Motets
 Tarentelle: Klavier
 Sonate: Violine-Klavier, 1907
 Serenade: Violoncello-Klavier
 Sinfonie, 1904
 Symphonie Wallone, 1923
 Andante Symphonique, 1894
 Renouveau: poème symphonique, 1913
 Vers l’Infini: Violoncello-Orchester

References

1866 births
1945 deaths
20th-century classical composers
Belgian music educators
Women classical composers
Belgian classical composers
Musicians from Liège
Women music educators
20th-century women composers